The Guianan toucanet, or Guyana toucanet (Selenidera piperivora) is a near-passerine bird in the toucan family Ramphastidae. It is found in Brazil, French Guiana, Guyana, Suriname, and Venezuela.

Taxonomy and systematics

The Guianan toucanet was originally described as Ramphastos piperivorus It was later named Selenidera culik but following early 21st century scholarship achieved its current (2022) binomial Selenidera piperivora.

The Guianan toucanet is monotypic.

Description

Males weigh  and females . Males and females have the same bill pattern but the female's bill is shorter. The bill has a yellowish line at its base. Both the maxilla and mandible are mostly black with red bases; the red extends further on the mandible. Both sexes have bare blue skin around the eye and a tuft of yellow feathers behind the blue. Males are black on the crown, nape, throat, breast and belly. They have a gold "collar" on their upper back; the rest of their upperparts are green. Their tail is green with chestnut tips to the feathers. Their undertail coverts are red. Adult females have a black cap and chestnut nape and upper back with only a hint of yellow collar. Their underparts are gray to green-gray with a green-yellow belly. Immatures are similar to adults but duller overall and with their plumage and bill patterns less distinct.

Distribution and habitat

The Guianan toucanet is found from extreme southeastern Venezuela east through the Guianas into northern Brazil and south to the Amazon River between the Rio Negro and the Amazon's mouth in the state of Amapá. It inhabits moist forest including gallery forest in savannas and favors primary forest over selectively logged areas.

Behavior

Movement

The Guianan toucanet is believed to be a year-round resident throughout its range.

Feeding

The Guianan toucanet's diet is mostly fruit, and it also takes insects. There is some evidence of coevolution with the Oenocarpus bacaba palm. It usually forages in pairs or small groups, and usually from the forest's mid level to the sub-canopy.

Breeding

The Guianan toucanet breeds between March and May in Venezuela and the Guianas and from April to July in Brazil. Males courtship-feed females. It nests in woodpecker holes, sometimes evicting the maker. The clutch size is two or three eggs. The incubation time in captivity is about 16 days but is unknown in the wild; the time to fledging is not known.

Vocalization

The Guianan toucanet has a wide variety of vocalizations but uses them infrequently. Its song is a "slow series of guttural, frog-like 'arrouk' notes". Its basic call is a "rattle, 'trrrr-trrrr-trrrr...', joined with rising squawk, rooster-like at times, 'kaaaaaaiiiiii'". It also makes "various soft rattles and other calls, some aggressive, others used in courtship feeding and at [the] nest."

In captivity

The Guianan toucanet is sometimes kept in aviculture as a breeder bird or a pet.

Status

The IUCN has assessed the Guianan toucanet as being of Least Concern. It has a large range, and though its population size is not known it is believed to be stable. No immeditate threats have been identified. It is considered common in much of its range.

Gallery

References

Further reading

 John Gould)/Henry Constantine Richter: A Monograph of the Ramphastidae, or Family of Toucans, London 1854
 reprinted with 51 plates and a preface by Jonathan Elphick, Taschen, Köln 2011 

Guianan toucanet
Birds of the Guianas
Birds of the Amazon Basin
Guianan toucanet
Guianan toucanet
Taxonomy articles created by Polbot